A Very StarKid Album contains several songs from the musical A Very Potter Sequel, sequel to the Harry Potter parody musical A Very Potter Musical, produced by StarKid Productions with music and lyrics by Darren Criss  (who also starred in both musicals as Harry Potter), and book by Matt Lang, Nick Lang, and Brian Holden. The album features seven of the twelve songs from A Very Potter Sequel as well as tracks from others members of the group. Songs from the musical that were absent from the album were later released as the A Very Potter Sequel soundtrack. The album was released digitally through iTunes and Amazon.com on July 22, 2010, and was made available on the StarKid Productions Bandcamp page on August 3, 2010. The album reached No. 14 on the iTunes Pop Charts and No. 27 out of all Top Albums officially topping Lady Gaga (#29) and Glee (#31) on the charts. The album also reached No. 19 on Top Compilations.

Track listing

Personnel

Featured Performers

Band
 Bruce Keisling – piano
 Clark Baxtresser – keyboard
 Chris Lorentz – bass guitar
 Corey Richardson – lead guitar
 Jack Stratton – drums

Release history

Chart performance

Other appearances 
 "Sami" was previously released as part of the web-series Little White Lie (2009), and was re-written as "Harry" for the A Very Potter Musical.
 "Not Alone" is a re-recorded version of a song from A Very Potter Musical.
 "Not Alone" and "Sami" were also released on Darren Criss' Human EP.
 "Ready to Go" and "Even Though" were also released on the Me and My Dick soundtrack.

References

External links
 StarKid Productions official website
 Star Kid Productions on YouTube

Works based on Harry Potter
StarKid Productions albums
Cast recordings
Theatre soundtracks
2010 soundtrack albums
2010 compilation albums